Dave Stanton is an American former AFM, WERA National Endurance, AMA Pro, and Formula USA champion who got injured while riding his Yamaha YZF-R1 during the first lap of the AFM Open Superbike race on June 2 at Thunderhill Raceway Park, in Willows, California. He was transported to Enloe Medical Center via medevac helicopter and was diagnosed with a punctured lung, a crushed spine and some internal wounds.

References

Living people
American motorcycle racers
Year of birth missing (living people)